The Bantamweight competition was the third-lightest class featured at the 2011 World Amateur Boxing Championships, held at the Heydar Aliyev Sports and Exhibition Complex.

The eight quarter-finalists qualified, subject to continental quotas, to compete at this weight at the 2012 Summer Olympics.

Medalists

Seeds

  Detelin Dalakliev (quarterfinals)
  Oscar Valdez (third round)
  Sergey Vodopyanov (quarterfinals)
  John Joe Nevin (semifinals)
  Veaceslav Gojan (third round)
  Anvar Yunusov (semifinals)
  Jahyn Parrinello (third round)
  Rahim Najafov (first round)
  Mohamed Ouadahi (second round)
  Denis Makarov (second round)

Draw

Finals

Top Half

Section 1

Section 2

Bottom Half

Section 3

Section 4

External links
Draw

Bantamweight